On The Red Dot is a current affairs/info-ed programme hosted by Cheryl Fox and Otelli Edwards. The show, which airs on MediaCorp Channel 5 and Channel NewsAsia, examines issues that are close to the hearts of all Singaporeans.

Episode list

Episodes 1-22 (2012-13)

Episodes 23-58 (2013)

Episodes 59-108 (2014)

Note 1: There was a technical glitch involving the reairing of the segment Chinatown Walk on Usher in the Year of the Horse, during the premiere run on Channel 5. The episode reaired on Channel NewsAsia in full, on the same day at 11.30pm.

Note 2: There was a technical glitch on Work in Progress: City in a Garden just before the end of the show, during the premiere run on Channel Newsasia, and the episode had to reair on 11 May 2014 at 11.30pm.

Episodes 109 onwards (2015)

2016:

118 - Vanished Places - National Library at Stamford Road

119 - Vanished Places - The Grand Old Dame

120 - Vanished Places - National Theatre

121 - Vanished Places - The Lost Worlds

122 - That's My Backyard - Geylang Serai

123 - That’s My Backyard - Serangoon Gardens

124 - That’s My Backyard -  Little India

125 - That’s My Backyard -  Chinatown

126 - Food Island - Science Of Food

127 - Fusion Island - Fusion Food

128 - Food Island - Favourites With A Twist

129 - Food Island - All Natural

130 Made in Singapore - Humour

131 Made In Singapore: Films

132 Made In Singapore: Fashion

133 Made In Singapore: Food

134 Footprints Through Time - Sports

135 Footprints Through Time - Defence

136 Footprints Through Time - Housing

137 Footprints Through Time - Education

138 Footprints Through Time - Transport

139 Footprints Through Time - Health

140 Footprints Through Time - Environment

141 When the Mountain Fell (Red dot Special)

142 Project 4650

143 Project 4650

144 Project 4650

145 Project 4650

146 Pioneer Generation

147 Pioneer Generation

148 Pioneer Generation

149 Wish Come True

150 Wish Come True

151 Wish Come True

152 Wish Come True

153 Wish Come True

154 Wish Come True

155 Lookback 2015

156 In My Helper's Shoes

157 In My Helper's Shoes

158 In My Helper's Shoes

159 In My Helper's Shoes

160 'Love in the Lion City'

161  Friends For A Better World

162  Friends For A Better World

163  Friends For A Better World

164  Friends For A Better World

165  Friends For A Better World

166  Friends For A Better World

Special Series (2020)

References

Lists of Singaporean television series episodes